The San Francisco 8 were eight former Black Panthers who were arrested in January 2007 for their alleged involvement in the 1971 murder of Sgt. John V. Young at Ingleside Police station. Herman Bell and Jalil Muntaqim were already incarcerated. Richard Brown, Richard O'Neal, Ray Boudreaux, and Hank Jones were arrested in California, Francisco Torres was arrested in Queens, New York, and Harold Taylor was arrested in Florida. Bail amounts were originally set between three and five million dollars each.

In January 2008, charges of conspiracy were dropped against five of the defendants, and Richard O'Neal was removed from the case altogether, changing the name of the case to the San Francisco 7. On June 29, 2009, Bell pleaded guilty to voluntary manslaughter in the death of Young. The following month, charges were dropped against Boudreaux, Brown, Jones, and Taylor. Muntaquim pleaded no contest to conspiracy to commit voluntary manslaughter. Torres, a Vietnam War veteran, had charges against him dismissed as well.

See also
Angola Three
Black Panther Party
Black Revolutionary Assault Team
George Jackson Brigade

References

Sources
 Free the SF8 - Committee for the Defense of Human Rights sf8 website
 Charges narrow in 1971 slaying of S.F. cop January 2008 ruling

African and Black nationalism in the United States
African-American history in San Francisco
Black Panther Party
Quantified groups of defendants
San Francisco Police Department
San Francisco Eight
San Francisco Eight
San Francisco Eight
San Francisco Eight
San Francisco Eight

gl:Exército Negro de Liberación